Amlach is a municipality in the district of Lienz in the Austrian state of Tyrol.

Population

References

Cities and towns in Lienz District